The United States Electoral College was established by the U.S. Constitution, which was adopted in 1789, as part of the process for the indirect election of the President and Vice-President of the United States. The institution has been criticized since its establishment and a number of efforts have been made to reform the way it works or abolish it altogether. Any change would require a constitutional amendment. In 1971, one of these attempts was almost successful in being proposed to the States. An interstate compact proposal, which would bypass the requirement for a constitutional amendment, is at 73% of successful completion .

Background 
The Electoral College was established by Article II, Section 1 of the United States Constitution in 1789, as a group of people independent of the government to vote on who should become president in the nation's quadrennial presidential elections. They cast legally binding votes which, since 1876, have been based on polling taken in each of the 50 constituent states and Washington, D.C.

Since 1800, over 700 proposals to reform or eliminate the system have been introduced in Congress. Proponents of these proposals argued that the electoral college system does not provide for direct democratic election, affords less-populous states an advantage, and allows a candidate to win the presidency without winning the most votes. None of these proposals have received the approval of two-thirds of Congress and three-fourths of the states required to amend the Constitution.

Criticisms

Popular and electoral vote 
Deciding the president by electoral vote (rather than directly by popular vote) means that the candidate who loses the popular vote can still win the election. This has been subject to major criticisms in recent years, especially following the 2016 election in which Hillary Clinton received 2.87 million more popular votes than Donald Trump, (a margin of 2%) while Trump received 304 electoral votes and Clinton 227, a margin of 34%.

Faithless electors 
Electors are expected to cast their votes in the state in favor of the candidate for which they pledged. There have been cases when electors have failed to do so; called faithless electors. While there is no federal law requiring electors to vote according to a state's popular vote, some states have put in place sanctions on electors who do not. The legality of these sanctions was upheld in 2020 by the U.S. Supreme Court in Chiafalo v. Washington.

At the 2016 presidential election, two faithless electors defected from Trump and five defected from Clinton.

Distribution of electoral votes 
The Electoral College allocates votes by giving each state two, and then dividing the remaining votes among the states based on their populations. The two votes being automatically allocated has allowed for disproportional representation of where people live in favor of the smaller states. For instance, California has an estimated 718,404 inhabitants per electoral vote, but Wyoming only has 192,920 per vote.

First-past-the-post system 

The Electoral College employs a first-past-the-post voting system, where a candidate who receives the most votes wins. Thus, when candidates have high support levels in states with smaller populations and lower support level in more populous ones, such as in 2016, this can have the consequence that the winner of the national popular vote can lose the electoral vote and not be elected president.

Winners of the popular vote in State elections usually get all of the electoral votes, but there is no legal requirement for a state to use a first-past-the-post system. , 48 states do; electors in Nebraska and Maine both divide their electoral votes into their congressional districts, allowing losing candidates to still win some electoral votes. Maine adopted this system in 1972 and Nebraska in 1996, however there have only been two occasions in which the winner of either state did not win the state outright. In 2008 in Nebraska, Republican candidate John McCain won all the districts apart from the 2nd, which was won by Barack Obama, who would later go on to win the election. A similar event occurred in Maine during the 2016 election, when Hillary Clinton won all but the 2nd district, which was won by Donald Trump, also the winner of the respective election. Lastly in the 2020 election, Joe Biden won Maine's 1st district while Donald Trump won Maine's 2nd district; and Donald Trump won Nebraska's 1st and 3rd districts, while Joe Biden won Nebraska's 2nd district.

Efforts to reform

District Plan Amendments 
There were several attempts in the early 1800s to require states to divide their electoral votes into single vote districts instead of at large. Districts within a state would vote for only one elector, allowing states to split their votes between different candidates. Reformers hoped this would decrease the number of safe states by allowing minority parties to win districts within a state, decrease the role of swing states, and decrease the chance of the winning candidate losing the popular vote.

Many members of the constitutional convention assumed states would choose electors by district instead of at large. On advocate for the amendments, James Madison, wrote in 1823 that the district plan "was mostly, if not exclusively, in view when the Constitution was framed and adopted." Between 1813 and 1824 the Senate approved amendments for the district plan four different times, and the House approved a separate amendment in 1820. None of the amendments managed to pass both houses.

Lodge-Gossett Amendment 
Named after its sponsors senator Henry Lodge (R-Massachusetts) and representative Ed Gossett (D-Texas), the Lodge-Gossett Amendment was a plan to allocate the electoral votes proportional to the popular vote. The amendment would have kept the Electoral College, but effectively rendered it useless. The amendment passed in the Senate, with a super majority of 64–27, but failed to pass in the House of Representatives.

Bayh–Celler Amendment 
The closest the United States has come to abolishing the Electoral College occurred during the 91st Congress (1969–1971). The presidential election of 1968 resulted in Richard Nixon receiving 301 electoral votes (56% of electors), Hubert Humphrey 191 (35.5%), and George Wallace 46 (8.5%) with 13.5% of the popular vote. However, Nixon had received only 511,944 more popular votes than Humphrey, 43.5% to 42.9%, less than 1% of the national total.

Representative Emanuel Celler (D–New York), chairman of the House Judiciary Committee, responded to public concerns over the disparity between the popular vote and electoral vote by introducing House Joint Resolution 681, a proposed Constitutional amendment that would have replaced the Electoral College with a simpler plurality system based on the national popular vote. With this system, the pair of candidates who had received the highest number of votes would win the presidency and vice presidency provided they won at least 40% of the national popular vote. If no pair received 40% of the popular vote, a runoff election would be held in which the choice of president and vice president would be made from the two pairs of persons who had received the highest number of votes in the first election. The word "pair" was defined as "two persons who shall have consented to the joining of their names as candidates for the offices of president and vice president."

On April 29, 1969, the House Judiciary Committee voted 28 to6 to approve the proposal. Debate on the proposal before the full House of Representatives ended on September 11, 1969 and was eventually passed with bipartisan support on September 18, 1969, by a vote of 339 to 70.

On September 30, 1969, President Richard Nixon gave his endorsement for adoption of the proposal, encouraging the Senate to pass its version of the proposal, which had been sponsored as Senate Joint Resolution1 by Senator Birch Bayh (D–Indiana).

On October 8, 1969, the New York Times reported that 30 state legislatures were "either certain or likely to approve a constitutional amendment embodying the direct election plan if it passes its final Congressional test in the Senate." Ratification of 38 state legislatures would have been needed for adoption. The paper also reported that six other states had yet to state a preference, six were leaning toward opposition, and eight were solidly opposed.

On August 14, 1970, the Senate Judiciary Committee sent its report advocating passage of the proposal to the full Senate. The Judiciary Committee had approved the proposal by a vote of 11 to 6. The six members who opposed the plan, Democratic senators James Eastland of Mississippi, John Little McClellan of Arkansas, and Sam Ervin of North Carolina, along with Republican senators Roman Hruska of Nebraska, Hiram Fong of Hawaii, and Strom Thurmond of South Carolina, all argued that although the present system had potential loopholes, it had worked well throughout the years. Senator Bayh indicated that supporters of the measure were about a dozen votes shy from the 67 needed for the proposal to pass the full Senate. He called upon President Nixon to attempt to persuade undecided Republican senators to support the proposal. However, Nixon, while not reneging on his previous endorsement, chose not to make any further personal appeals to back the proposal.

On September 8, 1970, the Senate commenced openly debating the proposal, and the proposal was quickly filibustered. The lead objectors to the proposal were mostly Southern senators and conservatives from small states, both Democrats and Republicans, who argued that abolishing the Electoral College would reduce their states' political influence. On September 17, 1970, a motion for cloture, which would have ended the filibuster, received 54 votes to 36 for cloture, failing to receive the then-required two-thirds majority of senators voting. A second motion for cloture on September 29, 1970, also failed, by 53 to 34. Thereafter, the Senate majority leader, Mike Mansfield of Montana, moved to lay the proposal aside so the Senate could attend to other business. However, the proposal was never considered again and died when the 91st Congress ended on January 3, 1971.

Carter proposal 
On March 22, 1977, President Jimmy Carter wrote a letter of reform to Congress that also included his expression of essentially abolishing the Electoral College. The letter read in part:

President Carter's proposed program for the reform of the Electoral College was very liberal for a modern president during this time, and in some aspects of the package, it went beyond original expectations.
Newspapers like The New York Times saw President Carter's proposal at that time as "a modest surprise" because of the indication of Carter that he would be interested in only eliminating the electors but retaining the electoral vote system in a modified form.

Newspaper reaction to Carter's proposal ranged from some editorials praising the proposal to other editorials, like that in the Chicago Tribune, criticizing the president for proposing the end of the Electoral College.

In a letter to The New York Times, Representative Jonathan B. Bingham (D-New York) highlighted the danger of the "flawed, outdated mechanism of the Electoral College" by underscoring how a shift of fewer than 10,000 votes in two key states would have led to President Gerald Ford being reelected despite Jimmy Carter's nationwide 1.7 million-vote margin.

Proposals to abolish 
Bills have been made proposing constitutional amendments that would replace the Electoral College with the popular election of the president and vice president. Unlike the Bayh–Celler amendment, with its 40% threshold for election, these proposals do not require a candidate to achieve a certain percentage of votes to be elected.

H.Con.Res.79 — 115th Congress
On September 14, 2017, Congressman Steve Cohen introduced a concurrent resolution asking that the sense of Congress be expressed that: (1) Congress and the states should consider a constitutional amendment to reform the Electoral College and establish a process for electing the President and Vice President by a national popular vote, and (2) Congress should encourage the states to continue to reform the Electoral College process through such steps as the formation of an interstate compact to award the majority of Electoral College votes to the national popular vote winner. On March 14, 2017, Congressman Jerry Nadler asked unanimous consent that he be considered as the first sponsor of the bill.

National Popular Vote Interstate Compact 

Several states plus the District of Columbia have joined the National Popular Vote Interstate Compact. Those jurisdictions joining the compact agree to eventually pledge their electors to the winner of the national popular vote. The compact will not go into effect until the number of states agreeing to the compact form a majority (at least 270) of all electors. The compact is based on the current rule in Article II, Section 1, Clause 2 of the Constitution, which gives each state legislature the plenary power to determine how it chooses its electors.

Some scholars have suggested that Article I, Section 10, Clause 3 of the Constitution requires congressional consent before the compact could be enforceable; thus, any attempted implementation of the compact without congressional consent could face court challenges to its constitutionality. Others have suggested that the compact's legality was strengthened by Chiafalo v. Washington, in which the Supreme Court upheld the power of states to enforce electors' pledges.

, 16 states and the District of Columbia have joined the compact; collectively, these jurisdictions control 196 electoral votes, which is 73% of the 270 required for the compact to take effect.

Footnotes

References

United States Electoral College
Electoral reform in the United States